Abacetodes is a genus of beetles in the family Carabidae, containing the following species :

 Abecetodes gilvipes (Boheman, 1848)
 Abecetodes harpaloides (Peringuey, 1896)
 Abecetodes mauroaeneus (Motschulsky, 1864)
 Abecetodes nanniscus (Peringuey, 1896)

References

Platyninae